Eleusis is a town in Greece.

Eleusis may also refer to:

 Eleusis (beetle), a genus of unmargined rove beetles
 Eleusis (Boeotia), a town of ancient Boeotia
 Eleusis (card game), an inductive logic card game
 Eleusis (mythology), mythological eponym of the town Eleusis
 Eleusis (Thera), a town of ancient Thera (Santorini)